Punjai Thottakurichi is a Town Panchayat in Karur district in the Indian state of Tamil Nadu.

Demographics
 India census, Punjai Thottakurichi had a population of 9589. Males constitute 49% of the population and females 51%. Punjai Thottakurichi has an average literacy rate of 63%, higher than the national average of 59.5%: male literacy is 76%, and female literacy is 50%. In Punjai Thottakurichi, 9% of the population is under 6 years of age.

Settlements
Ayyampalayam

References

Cities and towns in Karur district